The 2013 IAAF Road Race Label Events were the sixth edition of the global series of road running competitions given Label status by the International Association of Athletics Federations (IAAF). All six World Marathon Majors had Gold Label status. The series included a total of 74 road races: 36 Gold, 21 Silver and 17 Bronze. In terms of distance, 46 races were marathons, 12 were half marathons, 11 were 10K runs, and 5 were held over other distances.

Races

References

Race calendar
Calendar 2013 IAAF Label Road Races. IAAF. Retrieved 2019-09-22.

2013
IAAF Road Race Label Events